Livin' Broadway is a Uruguayan reality TV show aired on the VTV Network. It features 12 young artists who were chosen for a scholarship to live and study for 40 days in New York City, Los Angeles and Las Vegas.

References

External links
Livin' Broadway on YouTube
Facebook Page: https://www.facebook.com/livinbroadway/?ref=ts&fref=ts

Uruguayan television series